George Mason (1729 – 8 December 1783) was an Anglican bishop who served in the Church of England as the Bishop of Sodor and Man from 1780 to 1783.

Life
Mason was nominated Bishop of Sodor and Man by Charlotte Murray, Duchess of Atholl on 19 March 1780 and consecrated on 5 March 1780.

He died in office on 8 December 1783.

References

 
 
 
 
 

1783 deaths
18th-century Church of England bishops
Bishops of Sodor and Man
Year of birth unknown
18th-century Manx Anglican priests
1729 births